Braigo (Brai-lle +Le-go) is a Braille printer design. Braigo version 1.0 uses a Lego Mindstorms EV3 kit, which includes a microprocessor with assorted components such as electric motors, sensors and actuators. Braigo v1.0 was designed by 13-year-old Shubham Banerjee in January 2014, as an entry in 7th grade school science fair project. The model was based on the PLOTT3R, a bonus model released with the EV3 kit and originally designed by Ralph Hempel. The cost was said to be about US$350 or 250 Euros for the Lego Mindstorms EV3 kit and some extra commonly used hardware whereas a conventional Braille printer retails starting from about $1,900.

In August 2014, a new company called Braigo Labs Inc. was formed with an office in Palo Alto, California. Since Shubham Banerjee was a minor, his mother Malini is listed as the President of the company and the law firm Inventus Law acting as advisor.

On September 9, 2014, at the Intel Developers Forum (IDF 2014), Banerjee demonstrated 'Braigo v2.0'. As of at least February 2018 the product has still not been released and there have been no official announcements since 2018.

The inventor 

Shubham Banerjee was born in Hasselt, Belgium. The family moved to San Jose, California, when he was four years old. Later he moved to Santa Clara, California, and completed his elementary schooling at Don Callejon School. He joined Magnolia Science Academy in Santa Clara in middle school for a couple of months, before moving to Champion School in San Jose for middle school. He lives in Santa Clara, California, with his parents and younger sister.

Braigo v1.0

In Banerjee's own words, taken from the abstract submitted at Synopsys Science Fair: 

Braigo v1.0 made Open Source

As announced in a CNN and other interviews, Banerjee has decided to give away the design and software for free. He said on an NBC program "I think I'm doing something that could actually help people". He has uploaded building instruction on his YouTube channel, and also uploaded the software project file .ev3 on the LegoMindstorms EV3 community page. He said that "I think Braigo making the news will rejuvenate others and the beneficiary will be the visually impaired individuals. All good for humankind." Detailed download and build information is available on-line and detailed directions on how to build Braigo were published in Makezine.

Braigo v2.0

On September 9, 2014, at the Intel Developer Forum (IDF 2014) Mega Session: The Next Revolution in Computing: Edison, Wearables, and New Devices with Intel VP and GM, Mike Bell, Banerjee demonstrated Braigo 2.0. Braigo 2.0 promises to be the world's first, relatively inexpensive, silent, IOT enabled, light weight, consumer oriented, braille printer or embosser. Braigo 2.0 reportedly contains new patent pending technology in addition to Intel's Edison Chip paired with a development board.

After Braigo v1.0, the natural progression for Banerjee, after feedback from the visually impaired community, was to make a real consumer version that could eventually be bought off-the-shelf.

Transcoding of documents to braille on-chip
At Campus Party Keynote in São Paulo, Brazil, in February 2015. Shubham Banerjee gave a demonstration of a new method of transcoding documents to braille without any software installation on the computer. The technology involves uploading any document from a computer into the memory of the Intel's Edison chip that's the brain of the Braigo Braille printer. The idea behind this new method is to reduce the cost of ownership of the Braigo printer without having to buy any transcribing software for braille.

Awards/Recognitions

Media coverage

Television 
On February 21, 2014, CNN International in their program Quest Means Business, hosted by Maggie Lake, aired an interview with Banerjee about Braigo titled "Boy Genius makes Braille printer from Lego". On February 28, 2014, Lake commented on Twitter "Am I going to look back and say I interviewed the next Steve Jobs, Bill Gates?".
On February 29, 2014, NBCs Bay Area Proud program, hosted by Garvin Thomas, aired a full program dedicated to Banerjee and his invention of Braigo.
On May 13, 2014, NBC aired a "Bay Area Proud Updates" to inform viewers of progress with Braigo since their February 29, program aired. The program took segments of the official Lego "Build 4 Good" event video in Seattle, published in YouTube.
On March 15, 2014, MSNBC Melissa Harris-Perry program made Banerjee the "Foot soldier of the week". On March 4, 2014, Janet's Planet, hosted by Janet Ivey, an interview titled "Lego Braille Printer - Braigo Inventor on Janet's Planet" was made available.
On June 23, 2014, Banerjee was featured on The Queen Latifah Show and also a surprise recognition from Lego was presented to him by Queen Latifah- "Queen Latifah gives a special award to 12-year-old Shubham Banerjee who created a low-cost Braille printer out of LEGOS".

Radio 
On February 22, 2014, CBC Radio aired an interview of Banerjee on their program As it Happens titled "California seventh grader makes Lego braille printer"
On February 22, 2014 NPR aired an interview with Banerjee titled "Boy Builds Braille Printer Out Of Lego"

Creation of Braigo Labs Inc.
In August 2014, Braigo Labs Inc. was formed with Banerjee announcing that he is working on his next version of the Braille Printer and named it as Braigo v2.0. Since he is a minor, his mother Malini Banerjee is named as the President of the company with him listed as Founder. Braigo and BraigoLabs are both now registered trademarks of Braigo Labs Inc. The offices of the company is located in Palo Alto, California.

Intel Capital Investment
Intel was so impressed with Banerjee's efforts that Mike Bell, Intel's VP and GM of New Products Group announced at Intel Developer Forum (IDF 2014) that Intel will invest in Braigo Labs Inc. to help bring the printer to market. In Intel Capital Global Summit 2014, it was announced that they have closed the seed investment round for Braigo Labs Inc. founded by Shubham Banerjee,

Youngest entrepreneur to receive Venture Capital funding
On November 4, 2014, at the Intel Capital Global Summit, Intel Capital announced that they have funded Braigo Labs Inc. the startup founded by Shubham Banerjee. CBS News' John Blackstone reports, "the eighth grader is already a star; the youngest person ever to get venture capital investment for a start-up", reports CBS News correspondent John Blackstone; Silicon Valley Business Journal reported "Shubham Banerjee is among a couple dozen entrepreneurs who received funding from Intel Capital on Tuesday, but he is probably the only one whose father had to drive him there". Venture Beat Editor-in-Chief reported "Banerjee had to take the day off from middle school. That's because he's just 13 years old — making him, quite possibly, the youngest recipient of venture capital in Silicon Valley history. (He's definitely the youngest to receive an investment from Intel Capital.)" San Jose Mercury News reported on their front page on November 4, 2014, newspaper "And on Tuesday, Intel Capital, the company's global investment arm, will announce it has invested in the teenager's company, making Shubham the world's youngest tech entrepreneur to receive venture capital funding." In an article in The Wall Street Journal titled "Intel Capital's Arvind Sodhani: Unique Companies 'Rarer and Rarer'" on November 4, 2014, journalist Deborah Gage asked the question "You've been at Intel Capital for a long time. How much longer are you going to keep doing this?", Arvid Sodhani answered "I'm having fun. We're having a successful year. The fun part is meeting people like Shubham Banerjee who are passionate about pursuing their dreams and feeling comfortable that this is a risky business. It's not just a risk for us, but the individuals doing this are taking a risk at a personal level. I like pinpointing the risk—it's rewarding to have a success down the road." As reported by Johnny Dodd, reporter from People magazine, "'We've funded young entrepreneurs, but no one this young – certainly not in middle school,' a spokesman for Intel Capital says. The venture-capital firm recently announced an investment deal with Banerjee's company, Braigo Labs, that one source estimates is worth several hundred thousand dollars."

Microsoft Relationship
Shubham Banerjee was invited by Microsoft for their Student Tech Fair on May 13, 2015, in New York City to display his work with Braigo. After the event Microsoft published that Shubham is working with the Windows team at Microsoft to integrate the Braigo with the Windows 10 for easy integration of the solution that he is developing. "Now Shubham is working to bring the Braigo 2.0 to market. He's started working with my colleagues on the Windows team to integrate Braigo drivers with Windows for easy deployment."

References

American inventions
Braille technology
 
Robot kits